The 2006 Allianz Suisse Open Gstaad was the 2006 edition of the Allianz Suisse Open Gstaad tennis tournament. The tournament was held on July 10–16. Richard Gasquet won his second title of the year.

Finals

Singles

 Richard Gasquet defeated  Feliciano López, 7–6(7–4), 6–7(3–7), 6–3, 6–3

Doubles

 Jiří Novák /  Andrei Pavel defeated  Marco Chiudinelli /  Jean-Claude Scherrer, 6–3, 6–1

References

Allianz Suisse Open Gstaad
Swiss Open (tennis)
2006 Allianz Suisse Open Gstaad